Guinea made its Paralympic Games début at the 2004 Summer Paralympics in Athens.  They sent one athlete who did not medal.

Team 
Guinea participated in their first Paralympic Games in their history in Athens. The country sent a single athlete, Ahmed Barry, to compete in athletics. He did not win a medal.

Results

See also
Guinea at the Paralympics
Guinea at the 2004 Summer Olympics

References

External links
International Paralympic Committee

Nations at the 2004 Summer Paralympics
2004
Summer Paralympics